Nafees Bin Zafar (born 1978) is a visual effects and computer graphics software engineer of Bangladeshi origin based in Los Angeles, United States. Zafar currently works as Principal Engineer at animation studio DreamWorks Animation. In 2008, Zafar received an Academy Scientific and Technical Award thus becoming the first person of Bangladeshi origin to win an Academy Award. In 2015, he won a Technical Achievement Award.

Early life
Nafees Bin Zafar was born in Dhaka, Bangladesh and moved to Charleston, South Carolina with his family when he was 11 years old. He studied at College of Charleston and graduated in software engineering.

He is the son of Zafar Bin Bashar, a Partner at Marcum & Kliegman, and Nafeesa Zafar who reside in Long Island, New York. He is a great-grandson of the famous late Bangladeshi poet Golam Mostofa and grand-nephew of the famous Bangladeshi artist and puppeteer Mustafa Monwar .

Career
In February 2008, Zafar received an Academy Scientific and Technical Award for the development of the fluid simulation system at Digital Domain, which was used in the film Pirates of the Caribbean: At World's End. 
He was awarded the Scientific and Engineering Award, an Academy plaque, along with his colleagues at Digital Domain, thus becoming the first person of Bangladeshi origin to win an Academy Award.

In February 2015, Zafar was recognized by the Academy once more when he and his colleagues at Digital Domain received a Technical Achievement Award, an Academy certificate, for their work on the Drop Destruction Toolkit, used to create visual effects in the film 2012. He now works as Principal Engineer at DreamWorks Animation.

Filmography  
 Madagascar 3: Europe's Most Wanted (principal engineer)
 Puss in Boots (senior software engineer)
 Kung Fu Panda 2 (senior software engineer)
 Megamind (senior production engineer)
 Shrek Forever After (senior production engineer)
 Percy Jackson & the Lightning Thief (software engineer)
 The Seeker: The Dark Is Rising (visual effects: Digital Domain)
 Pirates of the Caribbean: At World's End (technical developer)
 Flags of Our Fathers (technical developer)
 Stealth (software engineer)
 The Croods (research and development principal engineer: DreamWorks Animation)

See also 
 DreamWorks Animation

References

External links 
 
 Nafees Bin Zafar: Linkedin profile

1978 births
Living people
Academy Award for Technical Achievement winners
College of Charleston alumni
Software engineers
People from Dhaka